Pagano Nunatak is a notable rock nunatak with a pointed summit (1,830 m) which stands in relative isolation, 8 nautical miles (15 km) east of Hart Hills and 80 nautical miles (150 km) north-northeast of Ford Massif, Thiel Mountains. The nunatak was examined and sketched by Edward Thiel in the course of an airlifted seismic traverse along meridian 88W in the 1959–60 season. Named by Advisory Committee on Antarctic Names (US-ACAN) after Chief Warrant Officer Gerald Pagano (d.1981), USA, assistant for plans and operations on the staff of the Commander, U.S. Naval Support Force, Antarctica, 1960–65; staff member, Center for Polar Archives, National Archives, 1972–81.

Nunataks of Ellsworth Land